Daniel Scott LaCouture (born April 18, 1977) is an American former professional ice hockey left winger who played in the National Hockey League (NHL). LaCouture is a graduate of South Hadley High School, in South Hadley Massachusetts.

Playing career
As a youth, LaCouture played in the 1991 Quebec International Pee-Wee Hockey Tournament with the Boston Bruins minor ice hockey team.

LaCouture was drafted 29th overall by the New York Islanders in the 1996 NHL Entry Draft. The Islanders traded LaCouture to the Edmonton Oilers for Mariusz Czerkawski on August 25, 1997. Initially, he played primarily for the Hamilton Bulldogs, Edmonton's American Hockey League affiliate, but became more of a regular in the NHL while playing for the Oilers in the 2000–01 season. On October 17, 2000, Dan scored his first career NHL goal against Andrew Raycroft and the Boston Bruins in a 6-1 Oilers victory.

The Pittsburgh Penguins dealt for LaCouture on March 13, 2001 sending Sven Butenschon to the Oilers. Lacouture had his most productive season, scoring six goals along with eleven assists, and playing in all 82 games in 2001–02. While playing for Pittsburgh until 2003, On February 10 of that year, he, along with Alexei Kovalev, Janne Laukkanen, and Mike Wilson were sent to the New York Rangers in exchange for Joel Bouchard, Richard Lintner, Mikael Samuelsson, Rico Fata, and cash.

During the 2004–05 NHL lockout, the Providence Bruins signed LaCouture to a contract. He played for the NHL's Boston Bruins and Switzerland's HC Davos in 2005–06. An unrestricted free agent in the 2006 offseason, LaCouture signed with the New Jersey Devils, playing in six games with the NHL club and thirty-nine with the Lowell Devils of the AHL.  He signed with the Anaheim Ducks in 2007, but was suspended by the team after he failed to report to Anaheim's AHL affiliate in Portland, Maine. LaCouture returned to the Swiss League and played 15 games for HC Lugano in the 2007–08 season. After a tryout that made an impression on the Hurricanes organization, he signed a one-year, two-way contract with Carolina Hurricanes of the NHL. He was called to Albany River Rats, but left the club on December 27, 2008 and signed a contract with Barys Astana of the KHL.

He completed his final professional season with Norwegian club, Lørenskog IK of the GET-ligaen in 2011.

On April 10, 2014, LaCouture was revealed as one of nine former NHL players to file a major class action lawsuit against the NHL, alleging that the league has generated billions of dollars while subjecting its players to 'the imminent risk of head trauma' leading to 'devastating and long-term negative health consequences.'

Career statistics

Regular season and playoffs

International

References

External links

1977 births
Living people
Albany River Rats players
American men's ice hockey left wingers
Barys Nur-Sultan players
Boston Bruins players
Boston University Terriers men's ice hockey players
Carolina Hurricanes players
Edmonton Oilers players
Hamilton Bulldogs (AHL) players
HC Davos players
HC Lugano players
Ice hockey players from Massachusetts
Lørenskog IK players
Lowell Devils players
New Jersey Devils players
New York Islanders draft picks
New York Rangers players
People from Hyannis, Massachusetts
People from Natick, Massachusetts
Pittsburgh Penguins players
Providence Bruins players
Sportspeople from Barnstable County, Massachusetts
Sportspeople from Middlesex County, Massachusetts